The Mecklenburg-Vorpommern Cup is an annual football cup competition, held by the  since 1991. For sponsorship reasons, the official name of the competition is Krombacher-Pokal. It is one of the 21 regional cup competitions in Germany and a qualifying competition for the German Cup, with the winner of the competition being automatically qualified for the first round of the German Cup in the following season.

The record winners of the competition are Hansa Rostock with nine titles to their name.

Mode
The competition is open for all member clubs of the Mecklenburg-Vorpommern State FA playing in the 3. Liga, Regionalliga Nord, NOFV-Oberliga Nord, Verbandsliga Mecklenburg-Vorpommern and Landesligas. Additionally, the regional cup winners of the previous season are also qualified. Reserve teams are not permitted to compete anymore. Up until the quarter-finals, the teams from lower leagues have home advantage against teams from a higher league. From the quarter-finals onwards, this is not the case. In case of a draw after regular time, extra time is played and, if this remains inconclusive, the game is decided by a penalty shoot-out. The cup winners automatically qualify for the first round of the German Cup.

Winners
The winners of the competition:

 ‡ Won by reserve team.

References

Sources
Deutschlands Fußball in Zahlen,  An annual publication with tables and results from the Bundesliga to Verbandsliga/Landesliga, publisher: DSFS

External links
 LFVM-V – Mecklenburg-Vorpommern football association 
 Official DFB results website 

Football cup competitions in Germany
Football competitions in Mecklenburg-Western Pomerania
Recurring events established in 1991
1991 establishments in Germany